Gould Mansion Complex is a historic home and national historic district located at Lyons Falls in Lewis County, New York. The district includes three contributing structures: the main house, carriage house and barn, and office building that served as headquarters for the Gould Paper Company.

It was listed on the National Register of Historic Places in 1978.

References

Houses on the National Register of Historic Places in New York (state)
Historic districts on the National Register of Historic Places in New York (state)
Houses completed in 1902
Historic mansion districts
Houses in Lewis County, New York
National Register of Historic Places in Lewis County, New York